Khaybar is an oasis situated some  north of the city of Medina in the Medina Province of Saudi Arabia. Prior to the rise of Islam in the 7th century, the area had been inhabited by Arabian Jewish tribes until it fell to Muslim armies under Muhammad during the Battle of Khaybar in 628 CE.

Climate

History

Pre-Islamic
Before the advent of Islam in the 7th century CE, indigenous Arabs, as well as Jews, once made up the population of Khaybar, although when Jewish settlement in northern Arabia began is unknown. In 567, Khaybar was invaded and purged of its Jewish inhabitants by the Ghassanid Arab Christian king Al-Harith ibn Jabalah. He later freed the captives upon his return to the Levant. A brief account of the campaign is given by Ibn Qutaybah, and confirmed by the Harran Inscription. See Irfan Shahid's Byzantium and the Arabs in the Sixth Century for full details.

7th century

As late as the 7th century, Khaybar was still inhabited by Jews, who pioneered the cultivation of the oasis and made their living growing date palm trees, as well as through commerce and craftsmanship, accumulating considerable wealth.

The oasis was divided into three regions: al-Natat, al-Shikk, and al-Katiba, probably separated by natural divisions, such as the desert, Harrat Khaybar lava drifts, and swamps. Each of these regions contained several fortresses or redoubts containing homes, storehouses and stables. Each fortress was occupied by a separate family and surrounded by cultivated fields and palm-groves. In order to improve their defensive capabilities, the settlers raised the fortresses up on hills or basalt rocks.

Military campaigns of Muhammad

Expedition of Fadak
In the year 627 Muhammad ordered the Expedition of Fadak to attack the Bani Sa‘d bin Bakr tribe, because Muhammad received intelligence they were planning to help the Jews of Khaybar. In this expedition one person was captured by Muslims, the rest of the tribe fled.

Battle of Khaybar
The Battle of Khaybar took place in May/June 628. The Jewish Banū *Naḍīr of *Medina, who claimed to be descendants of Aaron the priest, owned lands in Khaybar and had castles, fortresses, and their own weapons there. After Muhammad expelled them from Medina in 625, their leaders moved to their estates in Khaybar in order to prepare for war against Muhammad and to recruit the aid of Arab tribes. Muhammad first sent disguised guests to the homes of the leaders of Banū Naḍīr who then killed their hosts. Muhammad's victory over the Jews of Khaybar in the subsequent battle was also aided by the distance of the settlements and their castles from one another, the absence of coordination between the fighting forces, the death of the leader Sallām ibn Mishkam, and a Jew who showed the Muslims the secret entrances to one of the fortresses. The castles of Khaybar had tunnels and passages which in wartime enabled the besieged to reach water sources outside the castles. Between 16 and 18 Muslims and 93 Jews were killed.

After the Muslim victory, Muhammad, concerned that Khaybar would remain desolate and would not continue supplying its agricultural produce to the Hejaz, signed an agreement with the Jews which allowed many of its inhabitants to remain on their lands, while requiring payment of half their crops to the conquerors.

Aftermath

Captives of war and slaves from other countries were brought to Khaybar and the people of Hejaz became more accustomed to agriculture. Jews continued to live in the oasis for several more years afterwards until they were finally expelled by caliph Umar, who decided to expel the Jews of Khaybar in 642 under the pretense that before his death Muhammad had commanded that two religions could not exist simultaneously in the Hejaz.

The imposition of tribute upon the conquered Jews of the Khaybar Fortress served as a precedent. Islamic law came to require exaction of tribute known as jizya from dhimmis, i.e. non-Muslims under Muslim rule.

For many centuries, the oasis at Khaybar was an important caravan stopping place. The center developed around a series of ancient dams built to hold run-off water from the rain. Around the water catchments, date palms grew. Khaybar became an important date-producing center.

Expulsion of the Jews
During the reign of Caliph Umar (634–644), the Jewish community of Khaybar were transported alongside the Christian community of Najran to the newly conquered regions of Syria and Iraq; Umar also forbade non-Muslims to reside in the Hejaz for longer than three days. Since then, the Jews of Khaybar traveled around many areas throughout the Islamic Empire as artisans and merchants and maintained a distinctive identity until the 12th century.

The Journey of Benjamin of Tudela

Benjamin was a Jew from Tudela in the Kingdom of Navarre. He travelled to Persia and Arabia in the 12th century. He visited and described Khaybar and neighboring Tayma some time around 1170, mentioning these places as Jewish habitations.

Economy
Historically, Khaybar is known for growing dates. The dates raised in the region were generally exported to Medina.

See also
 Harrat Khaybar
 Safiyya bint Huyayy
 List of expeditions of Muhammad
 David Reubeni

References

External links

 Joseph Braslavi (Braslavski) and Leah Bornstein-Makovetsky (1972, 2006), Khaybar, in Encyclopedia Judaica, via Jewish Virtual Library

Historic Jewish communities
Jewish Saudi Arabian history
Oases of Saudi Arabia
Populated places in Medina Province (Saudi Arabia)